Pingshun County is a county in the southeast of Shanxi province, China, bordering the provinces of Hebei to the northeast and Henan to the east. It is under the administration of Changzhi city.

Climate

Notable Persons
 Shen Jilan

References

Weblinks
www.xzqh.org 

County-level divisions of Shanxi
Changzhi